Cummings Pond is a lake in Luzerne County, Pennsylvania, in the United States. The lake is fed by springs and an unnamed tributary of Sutton Creek flow from it. The lake was formed approximately 27,000 years ago by glacial action. It was historically stocked with fish and cattails and alders occur in its vicinity. In the early 1900s, the lake was used for boating, fishing, and ice harvesting.

Geography and geology
Cummings Pond has no inlets, but is fed by various springs. The main outflow of the lake is an unnamed tributary of Sutton Creek.

Cummings Pond is a natural lake and had no dam in the early 1900s. It has a regular, oval shape.

Cummings Pond is approximately 27,000 years old and is in a depression cut in hard shale by glacial action. The lake mostly retains its original shape.

One side of the lake was highly marshy in the early 1900s.

Watershed and biology
In the early 1900s, the watershed consisted entirely of second-growth forest. Cummings Pond is entirely within the United States Geological Survey quadrangle of Center Moreland.

Cummings Pond was stocked with yellow perch in the 1930s. The lake is in the C-1 Conservation district, whose purpose is to protect it and other hydrological features. Cattails and alders occur in the vicinity of the lake.

History and recreation
Cummings Pond was entered into the Geographic Names Information System on August 2, 1979. Its identifier in the Geographic Names Information System is 1198628.

During this time period, it was used for boating and fishing, as well as a private ice supply. Its ownership was claimed by Daniel B. Winters.

Cummings Pond is navigable with rowboats.

See also
List of lakes in Pennsylvania

References

Lakes of Luzerne County, Pennsylvania
Lakes of Pennsylvania